Avin "Vin" Guiang Abrenica (born May 27, 1991) is a Filipino actor who appeared as a contestant on the reality-based talent search show Artista Academy  and later won the competition with Sophie Albert. He is known for biggest break as Jepoy Madrigal in Wildflower and Elmer Marasigan, the villain and rival of Alex in A Soldier's Heart.

Career 
After his win in Artista Academy, Vin was cast as the male lead in Never Say Goodbye, a primetime series that aired on TV5. Along with Sophie Albert as the female lead. The cast also included Nora Aunor, Alice Dixson, Gardo Versoza, and Cesar Montano. That same year, he landed the role of Charlie Cadiz in Misibis Bay, a mini serye that inaugurated him as a hunk actor.

The following year, Vin appeared in the gay-themed comedy drama Beki Boxer and the romantic suspense drama Jasmine.

In 2015, Vin received a significant project to top-bill the remake of My Fair Lady with Jasmine Curtis Smith.

In 2016, he transferred his talent contract to ABS-CBN and Star Magic. He has initially made guest appearances in Ipaglaban Mo and Maalaala Mo Kaya. In the original plan for the primetime series A Love To Last (originally titled The Second Wife), Vin was set to play the role of Julia Barretto's love interest. However, the network executives later decided to cast him as one of Maja Salvador’s leading men in Wildflower. This role has taken another important turning point in his career since it launched him into a more prominent actor.

Vin's final project with the network was the primetime series A Soldier's Heart, where he played Capt. Elmer Marasigan. His character is a villain and the rival of Alex Marasigan, the main character in the series.

After much anticipation, Vin returned to acting in last quarter of 2021 when he signed with GMA Network and ALV Talent Circuit; He made his primary appearance in Tadhana: Kasalanan episode. He is now set to appear as one of the cast in GMA Network's action-adventure series Lolong.

Personal life
He is a younger brother of ABS-CBN talent Aljur Abrenica, himself a winner on StarStruck: The Next Level. He attended Don Bosco Academy, Pampanga.

He has two more siblings besides Aljur and he is the second oldest amongst his younger siblings, a brother and a sister. Also, he has two nephews, Alas Joaquin Abrenica and Axl Romeo Abrenica.

Abrenica has been dating actress Sophie Albert since June 2013. The two had met the previous year as co-competitors on the talent show Artista Academy, which they both won. Albert and Abrenica initially ended their relationship in 2016, citing "personal and career-related problems", but reconciled in 2018. In December 2020, the couple became engaged. In February 2021, Albert revealed that she and Abrenica had moved in together. That same month, they announced that they were expecting their first child, a daughter. Their daughter was born on March 15, 2021. They got married on January 25, 2023.

Filmography

Television Series

Reality show

Television shows

Films

Music video appearances

Theater

Discography

Singles

 2014: "Wala Namang Forever"

References

External links
  
 
 Vin Abrenica at Youtube
 Vin Abrenica at Instagram

1991 births
Living people
People from Angeles City
21st-century Filipino male singers
Filipino male television actors
Filipino male models
Male actors from Pampanga
Participants in Philippine reality television series
Reality show winners
TV5 (Philippine TV network) personalities
Star Magic personalities
ABS-CBN personalities
GMA Network personalities